Treowen Stars F.C. are a Welsh football club from the village of Treowen near Newbridge, Caerphilly. The club plays in the Ardal Leagues South East, tier 3 of the Welsh football pyramid.

History
They were promoted to the Welsh Football League for the 2010–11 season from the Gwent County League.

Honours 
Gwent County 1st Division Champions: 2009–10
League Cup Winners 1997–98
Promoted from Welsh League 2nd Division – Runners Up 1992–93
Welsh League 3rd Division Champions 1992–93
First division Champions 1991–92
Promotion from Division 2 1990–91
Promoted from the 3rd Division of the now Gwent County League 1986

Players

Youth Teams
Treowen Stars has a number of Youth Teams that develop players for the first team.  Players can start young, as early as under 8's mini football league and progress to the under 16's.  Youth Teams at Treowen play in the Islwyn Youth League, with the Under 16's having two teams, Treowen Stars A and B.

References

External links

Football clubs in Wales
Sport in Monmouthshire
1926 establishments in Wales
Association football clubs established in 1926
Gwent County League clubs
Welsh Football League clubs
Ardal Leagues clubs